Blagoje "Blažo" Bratić (March 1, 1946 – July 31, 2008) was a Bosnian Canadian footballer and manager.

Playing career

Club
Born in Sarajevo, he started playing football in Pretis Vogošća (later known as UNIS, and today as FK Vogošća) at the age of 14. As a talented youngster, he moved to Željezničar where he would become one of the more notable Yugoslav defenders at the time. He made his debut for Željo's first team in 1964, and was a standout member of the club's greatest generation that won its only Yugoslav First League title in 1972. He played 343 official competitive games for FK Željezničar, more than anyone in the club's 86-year-old history. He scored a total of 32 goals for the club in all competitions.

International
Bratić made his debut for Yugoslavia in a June 1972 friendly match against Venezuela and has earned a total of 3 caps, scoring no goals. His final international was a week later at the same tournament in Brazil against Paraguay.

He decided to end his playing career in 1976, at the age of 30.

Managerial career
He stayed in football, however, as the head coach of lower division sides such as Lokomotiva Brčko, Famos Hrasnica, GOŠK Dubrovnik, and Iskra Bugojno, before finally getting a chance to lead a top-division team with FK Željezničar in the first part of 1987/88 season. In the early 1990s he coached in Penang, Malaysia.

In 1994, Bratić and his family fled to Toronto to escape the Bosnian War. For some time, he worked as sports director and coach of the Toronto Metro Lions.

Personal life
Bratić was married to his wife Miza with whom he had two sons named Denis and Saša.

Death
Bratić died on July 31, 2008 at the age of 62. He is interred in Toronto's Mount Pleasant Cemetery.

Honours

Player
Željezničar
 Yugoslav First League: 1971–72

References

External links
 
 Profile at reprezentacija.rs

1946 births
2008 deaths
Footballers from Sarajevo
Serbs of Bosnia and Herzegovina
Yugoslav Wars refugees
Bosnia and Herzegovina refugees
Bosnia and Herzegovina emigrants to Canada
Canadian people of Bosnia and Herzegovina descent
Canadian people of Serbian descent
Association football defenders
Bosnia and Herzegovina footballers
Yugoslav footballers
Yugoslavia international footballers
FK Željezničar Sarajevo players
Yugoslav First League players
Yugoslav football managers
NK GOŠK Dubrovnik managers
NK Iskra Bugojno managers
FK Željezničar Sarajevo managers
Yugoslav First League managers
Burials at York Cemetery, Toronto